The men's tournament in wheelchair basketball at the 2012 Summer Paralympics was held from 30 August to 8 September. Competitions were held at the newly built Basketball Arena, which seated 10,000 spectators, and North Greenwich Arena (The O2 Arena renamed to through the Games because of a no-commercialisation policy on arena names).

44 matches were played, 30 in the preliminary round, and 14 in the classification and medal rounds.

Canada beat defending champions Australia in the final, while United States beat Great Britain in the match for the bronze medal.

Calendar

Group stage

Group A

Group B

Second round

11th/12th place match

9th/10th place match

Quarter-finals

Classification round

5th–8th place semi-finals

7th/8th place match

5th/6th place match

Medal round

Semi-finals

Bronze medal match

Gold medal match

Ranking

See also
 Wheelchair basketball at the 2012 Summer Paralympics – Women's tournament

References

Sources
 
 

Men